Taman Bukit Pasir is a township in Bandar Penggaram, Batu Pahat, Johor, Malaysia. This township is mainly for finance, banking, and commercial activities. Development of the township began in the early 1990s. Taman Bukit Pasir is located along Jalan Bukit Pasir and Jalan Tan Siew Hoe. The township is developing rapidly. There are many shophouses and houses in this township. A shopping area, Wira Court,  is also located in this township.

There are many banks in this township:
 EON Bank
 Standard Chartered Bank
 Bank Mualat
 Bank Ariffin
 Bank Allian

This township is under the jurisdiction of Majlis Perbandaran Batu Pahat (MPBP).

See also 

 Cities of Malaysia
 Batu Pahat
 Bandar Penggaram, Batu Pahat
 SMK Tinggi Batu Pahat
 Taman Flora Utama
 Taman Setia Jaya 2
 Pura Kencana
 Batu Pahat Mall
 Segenting(石文丁)
 Pantai Minyak Beku

Batu Pahat District
Townships in Johor